The Miracles Recorded Live on Stage is a 1963 live album by the Miracles, part of the early 1960s Motown "Live on Stage" series by various artists. The first of three live albums the group released during their career, it features R&B numbers led by Smokey Robinson along with Bobby Rogers, Ronnie White and Claudette Robinson recorded at either the Apollo Theater in New York or The Regal Theatre in Chicago, Illinois during their 1962 and 1963 tour. Miracles member Pete Moore was serving in the US Army at the time of this performance. The opener "Mighty Good Lovin'" was selected for various later compilations, while "I've Been Good To You" later appeared in a stereo mix on the 2002 compilation Ooo Baby Baby: The Anthology.

The Miracles: Recorded Live On Stage  was released  on CD as part of the 2009 Motown limited edition CD release The Miracles – Depend on Me: The Early Albums.

Track listing
All songs written by Smokey Robinson, except where noted.

"Mighty Good Lovin'" - recorded at The Regal Theatre in Chicago, Illinois, 1963
"A Love She Can Count On" - recorded at The Regal Theatre in Chicago, Illinois, 1963
"Happy Landing" (Robinson, Ronnie White) - recorded at The Regal Theatre in Chicago, Illinois, 1963
"I've Been Good To You" - recorded at the Apollo Theatre in New York, 1962
"What's So Good About Goodbye" - recorded at the Apollo Theatre in New York, 1962
"You've Really Got A Hold On Me" - recorded at the Apollo Theatre in New York, 1962
"Way Over There" (Robinson, Berry Gordy) - recorded at the Apollo Theatre in New York, 1963

Personnel
The Miracles
 Smokey Robinson & Bobby Rogers ("You've Really Got A Hold On Me"): lead vocals
 Ronnie White, Bobby Rogers, Claudette Robinson: background vocals
 Marv Tarplin: guitarist

Other personnel
 Berry Gordy Jr., producer

External links
The Miracles-Recorded Live on Stage Original Cover Artwork: 

1963 live albums
The Miracles live albums
Tamla Records live albums
Motown live albums